Reiner Scholl (born May 31, 1961) is a West German sprint canoer who competed from the mid to late 1980s. He won a complete set of medals at the ICF Canoe Sprint World Championships with a gold (K-2 500 m: 1986), a silver (K-4 500 m: 1989), and a bronze (K-4 500 m: 1987).

Scholl also competed in two Summer Olympics, earning his best finish of fourth in the K-2 500 m event at Seoul in 1988.

References

Sports-reference.com profile

1961 births
Canoeists at the 1984 Summer Olympics
Canoeists at the 1988 Summer Olympics
German male canoeists
Living people
Olympic canoeists of West Germany
ICF Canoe Sprint World Championships medalists in kayak